List of notable mosques in Rajshahi division-

Bogra district
 Kherua Mosque
 Central Baitur Rahman Mosque
 Mathurapur Central Jame Mosque
 Mahasthangarh Mosque

Joypurhat district
 Hinda-Qasbah Shahi Mosque

Naogaon district
 Kusumba Mosque

Natore district

Chapainawabganj district
 Choto Sona Mosque
 Khaniyadighi Mosque
 Darasbari Mosque

Pabna district

Rajshahi district
 Bagha Mosque
 Kismat Maria Mosque

Sirajganj district
Al-Aman Bahela Khatun Mosque

See also
 List of mosques in Dhaka Division
 List of mosques in Rangpur Division
 List of mosques in Khulna Division
 List of mosques in Chittagong Division
 List of mosques in Barisal Division
 List of mosques in Sylhet Division
 List of mosques in Mymensingh Division

References

Rajshahi Division
Buildings and structures in Rajshahi Division